S.T.D (Shelters to Deltas) is the second mixtape by American hip-hop artist Cupcakke. It was self-released on June 19, 2016. It was preceded by her debut mixtape Cum Cake, and was promoted with its preceding singles, "Best Dick Sucker" and "Panda (Remix)".

Upon release, S.T.D received generally positive reviews from music critics, who complimented its explicit nature and the execution of topics throughout the album. The mixtape was given a position in Rolling Stone's "Best Rap Albums of 2016 So Far".

Background and release
Cupcakke collaborated with artists, including Zachariah's "Hood Rich (feat. Cupcakke)", Kilo's "Short Bus", Big Meechie and his single "Muve", M.A.N. II's "Man Pussy", and frequent producer on Cupcakke's mixtape, Benzo Fly and his Random Act'''s single "Like a Snapback".S.T.D (Shelters to Deltas) was self-released for digital download and streaming on June 19, 2016, through iTunes, SoundCloud, Google Play and Spotify.

Promotion
Singles
The preceding singles, "Best Dick Sucker" and "Panda (Remix)", were released on April 25, 2016 and May 15, 2016.

Music videosS.T.Ds first single "Best Dick Sucker" received a music video upon its release on April 25, 2016. "Opportunity" received a music video on June 25, 2016. "Doggy Style"'s music video was released on July 6, 2016. On July 14, 2016, the "Motherlands" music video was released. The music video for "Sweet N Low" was released on August 24, 2016. "Interruption" received a music video on September 11, 2016.

Critical receptionRolling Stone gave it a position in its "Best Rap Albums of 2016" list, with Christopher Weingarten calling the mixtape's lyrics "filthy and funny enough to make sure Blowfly's legacy will live on for years after his death". Miles Tanzer of The Fader'' accolades the mixtape with its lyrics, which he states that "Cool Fuck" and "Best Dick Sucker" were "anthemic tracks that discuss sex and cum with the fervor, comedy, and creativity of the world's best preachers".

Track listing
Credits adapted from SoundCloud, ASCAP, and Broadcast Music, Inc.

References

2016 mixtape albums
Cupcakke albums
Self-released albums